Hillestad may refer to:

Places
Hillestad, Agder, a village in the municipality of Åmli in Agder county, Norway
Hillestad Church, an old name for Tovdal Church in Åmli municipality in Agder county, Norway
Hillestad, Vestfold og Telemark, a village in the municipality of Holmestrand in Vestfold og Telemark county, Norway
Hillestad Church, a church in the municipality of Holmestrand in Vestfold og Telemark county, Norway
Hillestad, Viken, a village in the municipality of Kongsberg in Viken county, Norway

People
Albert W. Hillestad (1924-2007), an Episcopal priest and bishop of the Episcopal Diocese of Springfield 
Dori Hillestad Butler (born 1965), an American author of children's books
Edmund Hillestad (1861-1946), an American businessman and member of the South Dakota House of Representatives
Erik Hillestad (born 1951), a Norwegian record producer and lyricist
Gro Hillestad Thune (born 1943), a Norwegian jurist and politician for the Labour Party
Margaret E. Hillestad (born 1961), a Norwegian politician for the Centre Party
Per Hillestad (born 1959), a Norwegian musician (drums) and record producer

See also
Hyllestad
Hylestad